The 2022 Rhein Fire season is the inaugural season of the new Rhein Fire team in the European League of Football from Düsseldorf, Germany. For this season the franchise will play their home games in the Schauinsland-Reisen-Arena in Duisburg near to its headquarter.

Preseason
After signing multiple coaches, the newly founded franchise announced the signing of their first player Sven Breidenbach for the 2022 season. In the following, the team planned to organise an invitational combine for December 18, 2021. In the 2022 preseason the management announced that former NFL Europe Rhein Fire head coach Jim Tomsula will also be the first head coach of the Rhein Fire in the European league of Football.

Regular season

Standings

Schedule

Source: europeanleague.football

Roster

Transactions
From Cologne Centurions: Till Janssen (November 8, 2021), Alberto Trovato (November 14, 2021), Richard Grooten (November 17, 2021), Daniel Schuhmacher (November 26, 2021), Timo Jüngst (December 17, 2021), Patrick Poetsch (December 21, 2021), Nick Wiens (December 24, 2021), Jannik Seibel (February 4, 2022), Florian Eichhorn (February 10, 2022), Jan-Niclas Dalbeck (February 17, 2022)

From Leipzig Kings: Jason Aguemon (December 30, 2021), Timothy Knüttel (February 27, 2022)

From Stuttgart Surge: Marvin Pludra (February 23, 2022), Domenik Rofalski (February 28, 2022)

Staff

Notes

References 

Rhein Fire (ELF)
Rhein Fire
Rhein Fire